7600 may refer to:
 The year 7600, in 8th millennium.
 7600 Vacchi, a main belt asteroid
 Remington Model 7600 rifle

Technology 
 CDC 7600, a supercomputer
 Cisco 7600, a network router
 NVIDIA GeForce 7600, a computer graphics card series
 Nokia 7600, a mobile phone released in 2003
 Power Macintosh 7600
 RTM build number of Windows 7 operating system

Transport 
 Tokyu 7600 series, a Japanese train series
 Aviation Transponder code for Lost Communications.